Azour (also spelled Aazour) is a village in Lebanon, located  from Sidon and  south of Beirut. It is 830 meters above sea level. Azour's area stretches for 263 hectares (2.63 km²; 1.01518 mi²).

The municipality of Azour is located in the Kaza of Jezzine, one of the eight mohafazats (governorates) of Lebanon.

History
In 1838, Eli Smith noted  'Azur as a village by Jezzin, "East of et-Tuffa".

Social life
The village population is around 1306. The majority of this population is settled in Beirut and its suburbs and treat the village as a summer destination to get away from the heat and bustle of the capital.

The inhabitants of Azour are mainly followers of the Maronite church.

Families
The major family name in Azour is Azouri عازوري(spelled also Azoury). All Lebanese with the Azoury family originate from the village of Azour. They are also distributed around the world, mainly Canada, United States of America, Brazil, Dubai and Mexico.

Notable people
Naguib Azoury

References

Bibliography

See also
http://www.azour.net/

http://www.localiban.org/spip.php?article3768

http://www.baldati.com/

Populated places in Jezzine District
Maronite Christian communities in Lebanon